The 1,000 Guineas Trial Stakes was a flat horse race in Great Britain open to three-year-old fillies. It was run over a distance of 7 furlongs (1,408 metres), and it was scheduled to take place each year in early April.

History
The event was originally held at Ascot. The present grading system was introduced in 1971, and the race was classed at Group 3 level. It was staged at Newmarket in 1978, and transferred to Salisbury in 1979. It was relegated from Group 3 status in 1983, and discontinued after 1986.

The race served as a trial for the 1000 Guineas Stakes. The last horse to win both events was Full Dress in 1969.

The equivalent race for colts was the 2,000 Guineas Trial Stakes.

Records
Leading jockey since 1968 (3 wins):
 Greville Starkey – Gilding (1976), Spring in Deepsea (1978), Go Leasing (1981)

Leading trainer since 1968 (3 wins):
 Harry Wragg – Ileana (1968), Full Dress (1969), Cheveley Princess (1973)

Winners since 1968

See also
 Horse racing in Great Britain
 List of British flat horse races

References

 Paris-Turf:
 galopp-sieger.de – 1,000 Guineas Trial Stakes.
 pedigreequery.com – 1,000 Guineas Trial Stakes.

Flat races in Great Britain
Ascot Racecourse
Salisbury Racecourse
Flat horse races for three-year-old fillies
Discontinued horse races
Recurring sporting events disestablished in 1986
1986 disestablishments in England